Pseudotephritis approximata is a species of ulidiid or picture-winged fly in the genus Pseudotephritis of the family Ulidiidae.

Distribution
Pseudotephritis approximata is found in the United States (Iowa, Michigan, Pennsylvania, and south to Mississippi and Virginia).

References

Ulidiidae
Diptera of North America
Insects described in 1914